The Humaita antbird (Myrmelastes humaythae) is a species of passerine bird in the family Thamnophilidae. It is found in humid forest in the south-western Amazon in Brazil and Bolivia.

Until recently, the Humaita antbird was considered a subspecies of the spot-winged antbird. A 2007 study of the vocal characteristics found significant differences between the taxa and based on this evidence the Humaita antbird was promoted to species status. As presently defined, the Humaita antbird is monotypic.

The conservation status of the Humaita antbird has been assessed by BirdLife International to be of Least Concern.

References

Humaita antbird
Birds of the Brazilian Amazon
Humaita antbird